Trzcińsko-Zdrój  is a town in Gryfino County, West Pomeranian Voivodeship, Poland, with 2,591 inhabitants (2005). It is also the centre of an urban-rural municipality with the same name, an area of about 170 km², and about 5700 inhabitants (2010).

History

The town probably originated from a Pomeranian settlement at an important trading route between Poznań and the Baltic Sea and has been a commercial centre ever since. In 1248 the settlement was known as Sconenvlete. Shortly after, the area came under the jurisdiction of the Margraviate of Brandenburg. The merchant's house, built in the town centre in the 13th century, soon became the town hall. In 1281 the town was recorded as Schowenfliet which later changed into the High German Schönfliess.

In the 14th century the town gained additional rights such as the one to a free market and the exemption from customs within the New March. From 1373 the town was part of the Lands of the Bohemian Crown (or Czech Lands), ruled by the Luxembourg dynasty. In 1402, the Luxembourgs reached an agreement with Poland in Kraków. Poland was to buy and re-incorporate the town and its surroundings, but eventually the Luxembourgs sold it to the Teutonic Order, whose rule lasted until 1454. It was burned down in 1433 during the Hussite Wars. Margrave John of Custrin, who took over the area in 1538, introduced the teachings of the Protestant Reformation. During the Thirty Years' War Schönfliess suffered major damage during occupations by the Imperial army in 1627 and by the troops of Gustavus Adolphus of Sweden in 1630, and was burned down by Wallenstein's troops in 1634. After the Napoleonic wars, economic development accelerated, and with the growth of the town, extra gates were broken into the old fortifications, parts of which were removed. Large parts of the town walls with several towers and two gates still exist to this day. Mud baths opened in Schönfliess in the late 19th century, and the town became a health resort and gained the official title Bad in 1907. Between 1871 and 1945 the town was part of Germany. After World War II, it became part of Poland, and its German-speaking population was forced to leave their hometown. The town was renamed to Trzcińsko-Zdrój. The spa closed in 1948 and was relocated to Połczyn-Zdrój, necessitated by the establishment of a Soviet airfield in nearby Chojna.

Notable residents
 Paul Billerbeck (1853–1932), German Lutheran minister and scholar
 Max Kahlow (1894-?), German World War I flying ace

References

External links
Official town webpage

Cities and towns in West Pomeranian Voivodeship
Trzcinsko Zdroj
Spa towns in Poland